Alice Stopford Green (30 May 1847 – 28 May 1929) was an Irish historian and nationalist.

Early life

She was born Alice Sophia Amelia Stopford in Kells, County Meath. Her father Edward Adderley Stopford was  Rector of Kells and Archdeacon of Meath. Her paternal grandfather was Edward Stopford, the Church of Ireland Bishop of Meath, and she was a cousin of Stopford Brooke and Mother Mary Clare. From 1874 to 1877 she lived in London where she met the historian John Richard Green. They were married in Chester on 14 June 1877. He died in 1883. John Morley published her first historical work Henry II in 1888.

Political engagement

In the 1890s she became interested in Irish history and the nationalist movement as a result of her friendship with John Francis Taylor. She was vocal in her opposition to English colonial policy in South Africa during the Boer Wars and supported Roger Casement's Congo Reform movement. Her 1908 book The Making of Ireland and its Undoing argued for the sophistication and richness of the native Irish civilisation. Stopford Green was active in efforts to make the prospect of Home Rule more palatable to Ulster Unionists. Alongside the Rev. James Armour, Roger Casement and Jack White, she addressed "A Protestant Protest" against Carson's Solemn League and Covenant at Ballymoney Town Hall in October 1913. She was closely involved in the Howth gun-running of July 1914, having extended Casement a loan to help buy the German arms.

She moved to Dublin in 1918 where her house at 90 St Stephen's Green became an intellectual centre. She supported the pro-Treaty side in the Irish Civil War and was among the first nominees to the newly formed Seanad Éireann in 1922, where she served as an independent member until her death in 1929. She was one of four women elected or appointed to the first Seanad in 1922.

Works
 Henry the Second (1903) first pub. 1888.
 Town Life in the Fifteenth Century Vol. I (1894)
 Town Life in the Fifteenth Century Vol. II (1894)
 The making of Ireland and its undoing, 1200-1600 (1909) first pub. 1908.
 Irish nationality (c1911).
 The old Irish world (1912)
 Loyalty and disloyalty: what it means in Ireland ([1918?])
 A History of the Irish State to 1014 published in 1925, was her last major work.

Further reading
 R. B. McDowell, Alice Stopford-Green: A Passionate Historian (1967)
 Leon Ó Broin, Protestant Nationalists in Revolutionary Ireland: the Stopford Connection (Dublin: Gill & Macmillan, 1985 )

References

External links

 
 
 

1847 births
1929 deaths
19th-century Irish historians
20th-century Irish historians
Irish women non-fiction writers
Irish Anglicans
Independent members of Seanad Éireann
Members of the 1922 Seanad
Members of the 1925 Seanad
Members of the 1928 Seanad
20th-century women members of Seanad Éireann
Politicians from County Meath
Women historians